CodeGirl is a 2015 American documentary film directed by Lesley Chilcott.

Overview
Documentary about high school age girls from around the world who try to better their community through collaboration and technology.

References

External links

2015 films
American documentary films
2015 documentary films
2010s English-language films
2010s American films